The 98th Brigade, also known as "98 Composite Brigade", is the first composite brigade formation of the Bangladesh Army.

History 
On June 23, 1998, Bangladeshi Prime Minister Sheikh Hasina inaugurated Bangabandhu Bridge over the Jamuna River in Tangail District and established the 98 Composite Brigade.

On January 29, 2015, Sheikh Hasina inaugurated the Bangabandhu Cantonment near the Bangabandhu Bridge and  opened the newly built headquarters of the 98 Composite Brigade Office Building, Mess Complex, family residences for the officers, JCOs and soldiers.

Functions 

 Securing movement of troops and supplies along rivers.
 Ensuring overall security of the bridge.
 Secure the river routes and deny the enemy access.

Formation 

The 98 Composite Brigade is composed of an Engineering Construction Battalion, an Air Defence Artillery Unit and an Infantry Battlalion. Soldiers and officers of the brigade were drawn from other units of the army.

See also 
 99th Composite Brigade

References 

Brigades of Bangladesh
Military units and formations established in 1998
Bangladesh Army
1998 establishments in Bangladesh